Epirhyssa is a genus of wasps belonging to the family Ichneumonidae.

The species of this genus are found in Africa, Japan and America.

Species

Species:

Epirhyssa alternata 
Epirhyssa amaura 
Epirhyssa amazonica 
Epirhyssa johanna

References

Ichneumonidae
Ichneumonidae genera